Brad Adams is the executive director of the Asian division of Human Rights Watch and has been in the position since 2002. Adams has had a few tasks at Human rights Watch, such as refugees, religious discrimination, freedom of speech and armed conflict. Adams has also written articles for different media including The Washington Post, The New York Times, The Wall Street Journal, The Guardian and Foreign Affairs.  
Adams worked in Cambodia for five years prior to his work at Human Rights Watch, where he was the senior lawyer for the Cambodia field office of the United Nations High Commissioner for Human Rights. He also worked as the legal advisor to the Cambodian parliament's human rights committee. Adams is a member of the State Bar of California and worked as a legal aid lawyer in California. He graduated from the University of California, Berkeley, School of Law. He currently teaches International Human Rights Law at Berkeley.

References

American human rights activists
Human Rights Watch people
Living people
Year of birth missing (living people)
Place of birth missing (living people)
UC Berkeley School of Law alumni
American expatriates in Cambodia